Bezirk Tamsweg is an administrative district (Bezirk) in the federal state of Salzburg, Austria. It is congruent with the Lungau region. The administrative centre of the district is Tamsweg.

Geography

The area of the Lungau plateau is 1,019.69 km², with a population of 21,283 (May 15, 2001), and population density 21 persons per km². It is located within the Central Eastern Alps, confined by the Hohe Tauern (High Tauern) range in the west, the Niedere Tauern (Low Tauern) in the north, and the Gurktal Alps (Nock Mountains) in the south. 

The region is separated from the Salzburg Pongau region by the Radstädter Tauern Pass crossing the Niedere Tauern. In the south, the Katschberg Pass road leads to the neighbouring state of Carinthia. Since 1974, the Tauern Autobahn underpasses both ranges via the Tauern Road Tunnel and the Katschberg Tunnel. In the east, the upper Mur River, originating near Muhr, flows towards Murau in Styria, accompanied by the narrow-gauge Taurach Railway and the Mur Valley Railway.

Beside some pastoral economy, Lungau largely depends on tourism.

Administrative divisions 
The district is divided into 15 municipalities, three of them are market towns.

Market towns 
 Mauterndorf (1,850)
 Sankt Michael im Lungau (3,590)
 Tamsweg (5,936)

Municipalities 
 Göriach (371)
 Lessach (575)
 Mariapfarr (2,213)
 Muhr (631)
 Ramingstein (1,388)
 Sankt Andrä im Lungau (738)
 Sankt Margarethen im Lungau (771)
 Thomatal (341)
 Tweng (310)
 Unternberg (984)
 Weißpriach (335)
 Zederhaus (1,250)

(population numbers May 15, 2001)

External links 

 Regionaldevelopment Lungau
 Website with detailed information about the region, its tradition and local customs as well as tourism information

 
Districts of Salzburg (state)